Iga Zinunula is a Ugandan poet and Veterinary Assistant. He has engaged in rural development work all over Uganda since 1990. He is a member of the editorial board of FEMRITE. He has been a judge at the Babishai Niwe (BN) Poetry Foundation.

Early life and education
Iga studied agriculture at Makerere University, majoring in livestock sciences.
He earlier went to the Veterinary Training Institute, Entebbe. He did his Secondary School at Namasagali College, after sitting his Primary Leaving Examinations at Nakanyonyi Primary School in Jinja. From Primary One to Five he attended Nakyenyi Primary School in the Kabaka's old county of Buddu, in present day Lwengo District, Uganda.

Writing
His poetry has been published in newspapers in Uganda, in Makerere University’s literary journal, Dhana, in the Uganda Poetry Anthology 2000 and in Painted Voices. His poem "Africa In Pain" has been used alongside work by renowned poets such as Susan Kiguli and Timothy Wangusa in profiling Ugandan literature.

Published works

Poems
"Talking donkeys", "Mbwa gwe oswaaza", in 
"My brother Abu" in 
"Age holds you down", "Love fetches water" in 
"Africa in pain", in

References

External links 
"Uganda: A Community's Effort to Get Safe Clean Water"

Living people
20th-century Ugandan poets
Makerere University alumni
Kumusha
21st-century Ugandan poets
Ugandan male poets
20th-century male writers
21st-century male writers
1964 births